The Pacific Citizen (P.C.) is a national, award-winning semi-monthly newspaper based in Los Angeles, California, United States. The P.C. has been providing the leading Asian Pacific American (APA) news to the community since its inception in 1929. The newspaper is published by the Japanese American Citizens League, JACL, which is the nation’s oldest and largest APA civil rights organization.

World War II coverage
Founded over 80 years ago, the P.C. was initially called , meaning Japanese American Citizen. The publication was based in San Francisco, California.

The publication’s name was officially changed to Pacific Citizen in 1931, chosen in a national contest. When World War II broke out, 120,000 Japanese Americans were interned. To keep the publication running smoothly, the newspaper was moved to Salt Lake City, Utah. In Utah, editor Guyo Tajiri and Larry Tajiri were hired to run the then-weekly newspaper. The print newspaper evolved into a reputable news source under the leadership of Tajiri.

Coverage during World War II included the chronicling of everyday life at the camps and the heroism of the Nisei (second generation Japanese American) soldiers. The Friends of the American Way nominated the P.C. for a Pulitzer Prize in 1946 for its journalism coverage. At war’s end in the early 1950s the P.C. returned to the West Coast to Los Angeles, California. On September 27, 1952 Tajiri put together his last P.C. newspaper as editor.

Redress coverage
Former Shin Nichibei staffer Harry K. Honda became editor when the newspaper moved to Los Angeles.

The P.C. also covered the Redress Movement, which sought to give reparations to Japanese Americans, who were interned during World War II. The P.C. was there in the room when President Ronald Reagan signed the Civil Liberties Act of 1988 granting Japanese Americans who were affected by the World War II internment an official apology letter and monetary compensation.

Today’s coverage
Today, the P.C. covers national news affecting the Asian Pacific American community. Coverage in the past years included exclusive interviews with 1st Lt. Ehren Watada, who in June 2006, refused to deploy to Iraq for his unit's assigned rotation to Operation Iraqi Freedom citing the legality of the war. The newspaper has also focused on civil rights issues, including same-sex marriages in California and beyond. The P.C. Web site has generated over 450,000 hits per month since its launch in 2005. The P.C.’s Web site provides exclusive content and articles that are not found in the print edition.

Currently, P.C. subscribers and JACL members can access an exclusive section of the PacificCitizen.org through the “MyP.C.” section. Today, the P.C. staff consists of: Caroline Aoyagi-Stom, executive editor; Lynda Lin, assistant editor; Staci Hisayasu, business manager; and Eva Lau-Ting, circulation manager. In 2005 Aoyagi-Stom won the New America Media Awards along with Lin, who also won the New America Media first place award in arts, sports and entertainment reporting in 2009.

The P.C. celebrated its 80th anniversary in early 2009.

References

External links
 Official website
Official digital archives
 Robinson, Greg. "Pacific Citizen." Densho Encyclopedia.

Asian-American mass media
Newspapers published in Greater Los Angeles
Japanese-American press
Japanese-American culture in Los Angeles
Asian-American press
Pacific Islands American culture in California
Transitional justice